is a Japanese photographer known for his large-format photographs of large-scale works of civil engineering in unpopulated landscapes.

Shibata was born in Tokyo. He graduated from Tokyo University of the Arts with a B.A. in 1972 and an M.F.A. in 1974 in which he concentrated primarily on painting. Shibata received a fellowship from the Belgian Ministry of Education to study at the Royal Academy of Ghent in Belgium from 1975 to 1977 and begin his study of photography during this period. He held his first solo exhibition of photography in 1979 and has exhibited prolifically since; from 1987 he has also taught photography in Tokyo.

Awards

1975, 1976
Fellowship, Ministry of Education, Belgium
1992
The 17th Kimura Ihei Award, Asahi Shimbun Publishing Co.

Books
Nihon tenkei / Photographs by Toshio Shibata. Tokyo: Asahi Shinbunsha, 1992. .
With Yoshio Nakamura (Nakamura Yoshio). Tera: Sōkei suru daichi: Shashinshū / Terra. Tokyo: Toshi Shuppan, 1994. .
Landscape. Tucson, Ariz.: Nazraeli, 1996. .
Toshio Shibata: October 11, 1997 through January 4, 1998. Chicago: Museum of Contemporary Art, 1997. .
Shibata Toshio Visions of Japan. Kyoto: Korinsha, 1998. .
Type 55. Tucson, Ariz.: Nazraeli, 2004. .
Dam. Nazraeli, 2004. .
Juxtapose. Kamakura, Kanagawa: Kamakura Gallery, 2005.
Landscape 2. Portland, Ore.: Nazraeli, 2008. . Color photographs.
Still in the Night. Koganei, Tokyo: Soh Gallery, 2008. Black and white night views, 1982–86 of expressways in Japan. Captions and text in Japanese and English.
Randosukēpu: Shibata Toshio. Tokyo: Ryokō Yomiuri Shuppansha, 2008. . Black and white and color photographs.
Contacts, Poursuite Éditions, 2013,

Notes

References
Nakamura Hiromi. "Shibata Toshio". In Nihon shashinka jiten / 328 Outstanding Japanese Photographers. Kyoto: Tankōsha, 2000. . P.165. 
Takeuchi Mariko (Mariko Takeuchi). "Shibata Toshio", in Kōtarō Iizawa, ed., Nihon no shashinka 101 (101 Japanese photographers). Tokyo: Shinshokan, 2008. . P.162.

External links
 Toshio SHIBATA gallery from gallery ART UNLIMITED.

Japanese photographers
1949 births
Living people